Omlet may be:
A misspelling of omelette, an egg dish
Omlet (2005), a Welsh novel by Nia Medi
Omlet, a thoroughbred horse who won the 1932 Grande Prêmio Protetora do Turfe in Brazil
Omlet Chat, a chat program included in the Asus Zen UI for Android phones and tablets
Omlet Ltd, a British company that manufactures the Eglu chicken coop